The Ministry of Regional Development was a ministerial department within the government of Poland. The ministry was created under the premiership of Kazimierz Marcinkiewicz  on 31 October 2005, having its functions devolved from the previous Ministry of Economy and Labour. The department was merged with the Ministry of Transport, Construction and Marine Economy in November 2013 under Prime Minister Donald Tusk, creating the Ministry of Infrastructure and Development.

Functions
The Ministry of Regional Development responsibilities included the coordination of policy between central and local government, drafting national strategies concerning regional economic development, and overseeing the use of European Union structural and cohesion funds.

List of ministers

References

External links 
 Ministry of Regional Development of the Republic of Poland official site

Regional Development
Poland, Regional Development
2005 establishments in Poland